James Romberger (born 1958) is an American fine artist and cartoonist known for his depictions of New York City's Lower East Side.
 
Romberger's pastel drawings of the ravaged landscape of the Lower East Side and its citizens are in many public and private collections, including the Metropolitan Museum of Art and Brooklyn Museums in New York City. His solo and collaborative exhibitions have appeared at Ground Zero Gallery NY,  the Grace Borgenicht Gallery, Gracie Mansion, The Proposition, and the New Museum of Contemporary Art.

Romberger has long contributed work in the comics medium to alternative publications such as World War 3 Illustrated. Ground Zero, his science-fiction strip collaboration with his wife, filmmaker Marguerite Van Cook, was serialized through the 1980s and 1990s in various downtown literary magazines.

His efforts for commercial comics publishers include work for Marvel Comics’s Epic Illustrated, Image Comics' NYC Mech, Paradox Press' Big Book series and Papercutz' Tales from the Crypt. DC/Vertigo published Romberger's work on The Bronx Kill with writer Peter Milligan, the Renegade storyline in Jamie Delano's 2020 Visions and the critically acclaimed Seven Miles A Second  Romberger and Van Cook's graphic novel done in collaboration with artist, writer, and AIDS activist David Wojnarowicz which was reissued by Fantagraphics Books in February 2013. Romberger's book "Post York," which included a flexi-disc of a song by Crosby Romberger, was nominated for an Eisner Award in 2013 for Best Single Issue (or One-Shot). 
In 2011, "Aaron and Ahmed," a collaboration with MacArthur Prize fellow Jay Cantor, was released by Vertigo/DC Comics.

Romberger is also a critic and writer for Publishers Weekly, The Beat and the comics blog the Hooded Utilitarian.

References

External links

American comics artists
Alternative cartoonists
1958 births
Living people
Artists from New York City
20th-century American artists
21st-century American artists